Caroline Graham Hansen (born 18 February 1995) is a Norwegian professional footballer who plays as a winger for Spanish Liga F club FC Barcelona and the Norway women's national team.

Hansen started out her professional career playing in the Norwegian Toppserien with Stabæk. She then spent the second part of the 2013 Damallsvenskan season in Sweden, playing for Tyresö FF. Hansen represented Norway at youth international level, and made her debut for the senior team in 2011. In 2013, 18-year-old Hansen played a major role in the Norwegian team that won silver at UEFA Women's Euro 2013.

Hansen made the move to the Frauen Bundesliga in 2014 to play for VFL Wolfsburg, where she began to develop multiple serious, long-term injuries between the years of 2015 and 2018. Despite this, she reached two UEFA Women's Champions League Finals with the club in 2016 and 2018, and won 8 major trophies- 3 league titles and 5 DFB-Pokal titles. In the midst of her club success with Wolfsburg, she struggled with her national team. In 2015, she missed that year's World Cup due to injury, and in 2017, she was part of the Norway squad that had their worst-ever finish in a Euro tournament with 0 goals and 0 points.

2019 was a breakout year for Hansen, when she signed for 2019 UEFA Women's Champions League finalists FC Barcelona, and was one of the most noteworthy players of the 2019 FIFA Women's World Cup with Norway. She was nominated for multiple year-end awards for the first time, including The Best and the FIFA FIFPro World XI. Her successes continued with FC Barcelona as she was integral to the 2019–20 side that won their first league title since 2015. Hansen then went on to win the UEFA Women's Champions League with the club for the first time in 2021, as well as the continental treble.

Hansen is widely regarded as one of the best wingers in the world for her performances for both club and country.

Early life
Hansen was born and brought up in Oslo, Norway, in the neighborhood of Tåsen. She is the eldest child of Petter Norman Hansen and Bettina Graham Hansen, and her brother, Fredrik, also plays football for American Division I university St. Bonaventure.

Hansen played for Lyn as a part of mixed-gender teams of both boys and girls up until the age of 14, because her coach said she was a bad influence to the boys on the team. This decision started debate within the club, and as a result, Hansen moved up to play with Lyn's G94 team, made up of boys a year older than her. Hansen says this is where she learned to play smarter and make better choices with the ball, because the boys were physically stronger by that point. Hansen played for Lyn up to age 15, and was a part of the team that won the under-16 girls' class in the Norway Cup.

Club career

Stabæk (2010–2013)
Hansen made the move to her first professional club Stabæk in August 2010, and made her Toppserien debut the same week, as a 73rd-minute substitute in the match against FK Donn. Hansen recorded an assist as Stabæk won 3–0. Stabæk won the league title later that year with a 3–0 home win over Trondheims-Ørn. She was a part of Stabæk's 2011 Norwegian Women's Cup winning team, who beat Røa on penalties after extra time. Hansen assisted Katrine Pedersen's equalizer during the extra time, but was the only Stabæk player to miss in the shoot out.

Tyresö (2013)

In August 2013, Hansen signed for Swedish Damallsvenskan champions Tyresö FF. In the second half of the season she started five of her seven league appearances and scored three goals. She also featured in Tyresö's Round of 32 tie against Paris Saint-Germain and Round of 16 tie against Fortuna Hjørring in the 2013–14 UEFA Women's Champions League.

Return to Stabæk (2014)
Hansen returned to Stabæk in January 2014 to complete her high school education, as she did not get the grades necessary to do so in Sweden. She was also concerned by the instability of the club, which would end up folding the following summer after reaching the 2014 UEFA Women's Champions League Final. She continued to be monitored by several leading European clubs and intended to move away again after finishing school in June 2014. Understanding that female footballers do not earn enough money to retire on, Hansen was planning for her career after football. Upon returning to Stabæk she arranged to play Toppserien matches for the women's team while training with the senior and youth male teams.

Wolfsburg (2014–2019)

On 8 May 2014, German club VfL Wolfsburg announced they had signed a two-year contract with Hansen. Norwegian media stated her annual salary as around £100,000. Near the end of her first season at Wolfsburg, Hansen was diagnosed with jumper's knee. This injury ended up destroying most of the tendon in her knee, leading to years worth of injury troubles. The injury kept her out of the remainder of Wolfsburg's 2014–15 Champions League competition and the 2015 Algarve Cup with Norway, as well as that year's Women's World Cup with her country. Hansen sustained another injury, a kneecap fracture, near the end of the 2015–16 season. The following month, Wolfsburg reached the 2016 UEFA Women's Champions League Final, where Hansen sat out with the injury as her club was defeated 4–3 on penalties to Lyon after a 1–1 draw in regular time.

In November 2016, Hansen suffered a fracture in her leg in a league match against 1. FFC Frankfurt that removed her from play for two months. After recovering from her leg fracture, Hansen returned to play in the 2016–17 UEFA Women's Champions League where Wolfsburg faced Lyon in the quarterfinal. In the second leg, Hansen scored a penalty in the 82th minute, but it ended up being nothing more than a consolation goal as the eventual champions won 2–1 on aggregate. Later that season, she won the domestic double with Wolfsburg for the first time, earning her first league title with the club as well as defeating SC Sand 2–1 in the 2017 DFB-Pokal final.

In February 2018, Hansen extended her contract at Wolfsburg for one more year to 2019. She won the league for the second time with Wolfsburg that season. A few days after her Wolfsburg's league win was made official, Hansen faced the first penalty shootout of her career in the 2018 DFB-Pokal final. She scored the decisive penalty against Bayern Munich, securing her second domestic double with the club. In the final, however, she picked up an injury but played the full 120 minutes of the match. Less than a week later, she started the 2018 UEFA Women's Champions League Final, but went down in pain after a quarter of an hour. Hansen was taken off injured at halftime and replaced by Tessa Wullaert, and the final went to extra time where Wolfsburg lost to Lyon after Lyon scored 4 goals within twenty minutes.

In Hansen's final season at Wolfsburg, she decided to not renew her contract, which expired that year. That season, she won the DFB-Pokal with Wolfsburg for the fifth time, where she started and played all 90 minutes in the final against SC Freiburg, which ended 1–0 for Wolfsburg thanks to a goal from Ewa Pajor. Wolfsburg also won the league again that year, her third such title with the club.

In her final season in Wolfsburg, she had scored 14 goals and registered 29 assists in 33 matches. By the end of her time in Germany, she had scored 51 goals in 133 appearances and won 8 major trophies.

Barcelona (2019–present)

2019–20 season
On 20 May 2019, it was announced Hansen had signed with FC Barcelona on a two-year contract, becoming the first Norwegian (both in men's and women's football) to sign for the blaugrana club. She mentioned being attracted to Barcelona because of their possession style of football. Her first title with the club came on 24 August 2020, winning the Copa Catalunya. Hansen made her league debut with the club on the first matchday of the season, where Barcelona defeated CD TACÓN (now Real Madrid Femenino). Hansen scored the 6th goal in a rout of Los Blancos that ended 9-1 in Barcelona's favor.

On 10 February 2020, Barcelona beat Real Sociedad by 10–1 to archive the Supercopa de España title, with Hansen scoring Barcelona's fifth goal. In March 2020, Hansen joined a group of athletes in donating 10% of her Barcelona salary to people affected by the COVID-19 pandemic. On 6 May 2020, the Royal Spanish Football Federation announced the premature end of the league, naming Barcelona as league champions. She finished the 2019-20 league season as the Primera Division's top assister.

Although the domestic league was concluded, the 2019–20 UEFA Women's Champions League competition still remained suspended until its resumption in August 2020, where it was played in the Basque Country in single-leg knockout stages. Hansen started the match against Barcelona's domestic rivals Atlético Madrid in the quarterfinals, where she played all 90 minutes. Barcelona were kept scoreless until they were rescued by a goal in the 80th minute from Kheira Hamraoui, who scored from a ball rebounded off a cross from Hansen. In the semifinal, she faced her former team VfL Wolfsburg, where Barcelona fell 1–0 to the Germans.

2020–21 season
In 2021, Hansen started the first competitive match ever played by a women's team at the Camp Nou. In that match, she assisted Alexia Putellas from a corner, the first ever goal scored by a woman at the stadium. About a week later, she renewed her contract with Barcelona until 2023.

In the 2020–21 UEFA Women's Champions League Round of 32, Hansen scored two goals against Dutch side PSV, as Barcelona finished the tie with an aggregate score of 8-2 in their favor. Barcelona advanced to the Round of 16 against Fortuna Hjørring and then to the quarterfinals, where they faced Manchester City. Hansen started the first leg of the quarterfinal, but limped off the pitch in the 62nd minute with a knee injury. She returned for the second leg, where she assisted Asisat Oshoala in Barcelona's only goal of the match, which ended City 2–1 Barcelona.

Barcelona moved on to face Paris Saint-Germain in their semifinal tie. In the second leg of the semifinals, Hansen assisted Lieke Martens' second goal from a cross across the box. That second goal brought the aggregate score of the tie to 3–2, and sent Barcelona to their second ever UEFA Women's Champions League Final. On 16 May 2021, Hansen started the final against Chelsea and scored Barcelona's fourth goal of the match, a tap-in from a Martens assist in the 36th minute. Hansen's goal made it 4–0 against Chelsea, the largest margin of victory in any single-legged UWCL final. Hansen was substituted in the 62nd minute of the final by Mariona Caldenty and lifted her first European title of her career after two losses in two other Champions League finals. She revealed in a post-match interview that due to her years of injuries and repeated losses in Champions League finals that she used to feel that "football was no longer fun" and intended to retire prematurely back in 2018. Hansen was named to the 2020–21 UWCL Squad of the Season alongside seven other Barcelona players, and ended that year's UWCL campaign with 3 goals and 5 assists in 9 matches. She was later listed as one of nominees to the UEFA Women's Champions League Forward of the Season award.

Hansen finished her league season as Spain's assist leader with 18. In November 2021, Hansen was named Player of the Season for the 2020–21 Primera División.

2021–22 season
In November 2021, she was temporarily taken off the active roster after experiencing a overly high heart rate and chest discomfort during a match. The club announced that she would be undergoing cardiac diagnostic tests as a result. The club later announced that would be returning to play after successfully undergoing treatment for a heart condition. Hansen returned to the pitch in Barcelona's UEFA Women's Champion's League second group stage match against Arsenal W.F.C., where she assisted Jenni Hermoso's second goal in a 4-0 win.

2022–23 season 
In January 2023, Hansen extended her contract with Barcelona until June 2026.

International career
In 2011, 16-year-old Hansen was a part of the Norwegian under-19 team who finished as runners-up in the 2011 UEFA Women's U-19 Championship, after losing the final against Germany. Hansen was also included in the Norwegian squad for the 2012 FIFA U-20 Women's World Cup in Japan, where the team reached the quarter-final.

She made her senior debut for Norway against Belgium in November 2011. In June 2012 Hansen scored her first senior international goal in an 11–0 rout of Bulgaria, a match in which she also assisted more than half of Norway's goals.

Hansen was named to Norway's squad for UEFA Women's Euro 2013 by veteran coach Even Pellerud. Winger Hansen and fellow teenage forward Ada Hegerberg at striker were important players in the Norwegian team which reached the competition's final. In the final at Friends Arena, Hansen won a 61st-minute penalty after drawing a foul from Saskia Bartusiak, but Germany's goalkeeper Nadine Angerer made her second penalty save of the match. Anja Mittag's goal gave the Germans their sixth successive title.

Hansen's 2015 knee injury kept her out of that year's Algarve Cup, putting her in doubt for participation in the 2015 Women's World Cup. It was made official on 19 May 2015, that she would be ruled out of the World Cup after failing to recover from the injury in time for the competition. Hansen made her national team comeback in January of the following year, scoring one of Norway's 6 goals against Romania.

Hansen was named to the national team squad ahead of the UEFA Women's Euro 2017. Norway were drawn into a very difficult group made up of eventual tournament winners the Netherlands, eventual tournament runners-up Denmark, and Belgium. Their first match came against the Netherlands, where Norway were defeated 1–0. Following that loss, Norway then fell 2–0 to Belgium, where Hansen said after the match that she should've been awarded a penalty for being taken down in the box by Belgium's keeper. Norway moved on to the final match of the group stage, where they played Denmark. Prior to the match, Denmark's assistant coach criticized Hansen and Ada Hegerberg, saying that she "expected more of the two," and that her team's game plan was to shut down the pair of forwards. Denmark went up 1–0 just five minutes into the match, but just before halftime, Hegerberg drew a penalty that was taken and missed by Hansen. The match ended in another loss for Norway. At the end of it all, Norway scored zero goals, recording 3 losses, earning 0 points, and going out in the group stage of the tournament the first time since 1997. Their finish prompted the controversial national team retirement of Hegerberg, one of Hansen's longtime national team teammates, a decision that "surprised" Hansen. After the tournament, Hansen criticized the NFF for the lack of funding allocated to the women's team.

Norway's struggles continued into the group stages of qualification for the 2019 FIFA Women's World Cup where they were defeated by the Netherlands from an extra-time header from Vivianne Miedema, where Hansen left the pitch in tears. The defeat put them at risk for not finishing first in their qualifying group, which could have potentially sent them to qualification playoffs. However, 7 straight wins including a much-needed win against the Dutch sent them to the top of the table, automatically qualifying them for the 2019 Women's World Cup. Hansen scored 6 goals in 8 of Norway's qualifying matches. She also took up a captaincy role for the national team around this time, joining teammates Maren Mjelde and Ingrid Moe Wold.

In 2019, it was announced that she would represent Norway in the 2019 FIFA Women's World Cup. This would later turn out to be a breakout tournament for Hansen, as she became the standout forward in Norway's first major international competition since the retirement of Ada Hegerberg in 2017. In the first match of the group stage, Norway faced Nigeria, where Hansen recorded an assist to Guro Reiten in Norway's first goal of the tournament. Norway won that match 3–0. In the final group stage match, Norway faced South Korea, where Hansen scored the penalty that sent Norway 1–0 up. The match ended 2–1 in Norway's favor, and they made it through to the Round of 16 with a second-place finish in Group A. She ended the match on crutches after taking a bad knock on her left ankle that resulted in a penalty kick for Norway. She played 65 minutes before she was taken out of the game and earned a Player of the Match award for her performance.

Despite her injury sustained against South Korea, Hansen played Australia in the Round of 16, where Norway won unexpectedly after going to a penalty shootout. She scored the first of Norway's 4 penalties and the shootout finished Norway 4–1 Australia. Hansen earned her second Player of the Match award of the tournament for her performance against the Aussies. Norway then advanced to the quarter-finals, where they were knocked out of the tournament by England. Despite exiting the tournament in the quarterfinals, she completed the most dribbles out of any other player.

Style of play
Hansen is a technically skilled winger, most known for her dribbling ability, one-on-one challenges, and passing quality.

In 2011, Hansen received the Statoil's Talent Award for the month of October. The award's jury, consisting of former Norway men's national team manager Nils Johan Semb and Norway women's youth national team manager Jarl Torske, revered 16-year-old Hansen for her skills on the ball. They highlighted her speed, her finishing, and her ability to challenge players one-on-one. Hansen's former manager at Wolfsburg, Stephan Lerch, describes her as "dominating a high-tempo game" and being very strong technically. Norway national team manager Martin Sjögren describes her similarly, saying her technical skills and speed are "exceptional."

Hansen has been described as an "atypical Norwegian," known for her dribbling skills and technical finesse unlike other Norwegians who tend to play more physically.

Personal life
Hansen's childhood idol was former Barcelona forward Rivaldo.

Hansen has discussed her struggles with her mental health after dealing with multiple injury problems during her time at Wolfsburg. In 2019, she spoke about how she sought help from a sports psychologist.

Career statistics

Club

International 

Scores and results list Norway's goal tally first, score column indicates score after each Graham Hansen goal.

Honours
Stabæk
Toppserien: 2010, 2013
Norwegian Women's Cup: 2011, 2012, 2013

VfL Wolfsburg
 Frauen-Bundesliga: 2016–17, 2017–18, 2018–19
 DFB-Pokal: 2014–15, 2015–16, 2016–17, 2017–18, 2018–19

FC Barcelona
Primera División: 2019–20, 2020–21, 2021–22
UEFA Women's Champions League: 2020–21
Copa Catalunya: 2019
Supercopa de España: 2019–20, 2021–22
Copa de la Reina: 2020, 2021

Individual
Statoil Talent Award of the Year: 2012
Gullballen: 2019, 2020
Primera División MVP of the Season: 2020–21
The Best FIFA Football Awards Nominee: 2019, 2020
UEFA Women's Champions League Squad of the Season: 2019–20, 2020–21

Awards and recognition
In 2012, Hansen was awarded the Statoil Talent Award of the Year award, where the NFF and TV2 recognize Norway's single most talented male and female footballers of that year. She was awarded 50,000 kroner for her win, which she chose to donate to Stabæk.

In 2019, Hansen earned a nomination at that year's The Best FIFA awards, most notably for her performances with Norway at the 2019 FIFA Women's World Cup. She finished in 12th place alongside Sam Kerr with zero overall points. The following year, she was nominated for the award again, finishing 8th place with 15 points, the same amount as Barcelona teammate Jenni Hermoso.

In 2019, after her seasons for both club and country, she was named #13 in that year's GOAL50, an annual list of the 25 best male and female footballers awarded by online football publication GOAL. In 2020, Hansen rose seven places to #6 for GOAL50. She was also a nominee for the 2020 UEFA Team of the Year.

In 2018, Hansen made it to The Guardian's first list of The 100 Best Female Footballers In The World, coming in at #20. Hansen moved up 5 places to #15 in 2019, and the following year, she moved up 7 places as the 8th-best female footballer in the world.

Hansen has been nominated as a FIFA FIFPro Women's World11 finalist twice, once in 2019 and again in 2020.

References

External links

 Caroline Graham Hansen at FC Barcelona
 Caroline Graham Hansen at BDFutbol
 
 
 
  (archive)
 Caroline Graham Hansen at Stabæk 
 Caroline Graham Hansen at VfL Wolfsburg 

1995 births
Living people
Footballers from Oslo
Norwegian people of British descent
Norwegian women's footballers
Norway women's international footballers
Stabæk Fotball Kvinner players
Tyresö FF players
Damallsvenskan players
Norwegian expatriate women's footballers
VfL Wolfsburg (women) players
Expatriate women's footballers in Germany
Norwegian expatriate sportspeople in Germany
Norwegian expatriate sportspeople in Sweden
Expatriate women's footballers in Sweden
Norwegian expatriate sportspeople in Spain
Expatriate women's footballers in Spain
Women's association football midfielders
2019 FIFA Women's World Cup players
FC Barcelona Femení players
Primera División (women) players
Frauen-Bundesliga players
UEFA Women's Euro 2022 players
UEFA Women's Euro 2017 players